The Anglo-American cable chess matches were a series of yearly chess matches between teams from the United States and Great Britain conducted over transatlantic cable from 1896 to 1911, except for the three-year gap of 1904 to 1906 when no matches were held.  This series was closely contested, with each team winning six matches and one match being drawn.  The individual game total over the series was also even (+39 −39 =50).  The series ended when Great Britain won their third consecutive match, thereby earning permanent custody of the silver cup provided by Sir George Newnes.  There were other cable matches held in the late 19th and early 20th centuries, but this series is the most well-known.

Prominent players from both sides of the Atlantic would participate over the years.  Some who played for Great Britain included Joseph Blackburne, Amos Burn, Henry Bird, Henry Atkins, Horatio Caro, James Mason, Frederick Yates, Sir George Thomas, and Thomas Lawrence.  Some who played for the United States included Harry Pillsbury, Jackson Showalter, Frank Marshall, Albert Hodges, Eugene Delmar, and John Barry.

Background 

Hooper and Whyld call the first half of the 19th century the "golden age" of correspondence chess.  With travel difficult and expensive, chess clubs began to play games with distant clubs by mail.  Examples of early matches were between Edinburgh and London from 1824–1828 and between Paris and various other cities in the 1830s and 1840s.  Individual correspondence chess did not become popular until postage rates declined to more affordable levels.

Development of the electrical telegraph made a new technology available to chess clubs.  The first known match by telegraph was between Washington and Baltimore in 1844.  Other early matches were Liverpool versus Dublin in 1861, Liverpool versus Calcutta in 1880–1881, London versus Petersburg in 1886–1887, Petersburg versus Paris in 1894–1895, and Petersburg versus Vienna in 1898–1899.  These matches were not played in one session, but were conducted over a longer time period as in chess played via mail.

The first attempt at a same-session cable match and the direct predecessor of the Anglo-American series was a match between the British Chess Club and the Manhattan Chess Club on 9 March 1895.  Only one of the ten games concluded by the time the London hall was required to close, a draw being agreed.  Emanuel Lasker, charged with adjudicating unfinished games, suggested draws on the nine remaining boards and this was acceptable to both clubs.

The matches 

Drawing on experience with the 1895 cable match played by the Manhattan club, the Brooklyn Chess Club organized the first Anglo-American chess match.  Participation was restricted to native citizens, and play was held for two four-hour sessions per day over two days.  The time limit was 20 moves per hour.  The Brooklyn club suggested eight players per team and the British club preferred ten players per team.  The first match in 1896 used eight players per team, but all subsequent matches used ten players per team.  As before, Emanuel Lasker would adjudicate any unfinished games, although over the course of the series adjudication would not be required until the tenth match of the series.  Sir George Newnes was president of the British Chess Club and he provided the silver cup that would go to the winning team until the next match.  Negotiation of conditions were substantially complete by the end of 1895, but the match itself would not take place until the spring of 1896.

1896 match 

The first match of the series was held 13–14 March 1896.  The United States team had white on the odd-numbered boards and the British team had white on the even-numbered boards.  The United States team won by a single game.

{| class="wikitable"
|-
! Board !! United States !! Great Britain !! Winner
|-
| 1 || Pillsbury || Blackburne || GB
|-
| 2 || Showalter || Burn || US
|-
| 3 || Burille || Bird || US
|-
| 4 || Barry || Tinsley || US
|-
| 5 || Hymes || Locock || draw
|-
| 6 || Hodges || Mills || draw
|-
| 7 || Delmar || Atkins || draw
|-
| 8 || Baird || Jackson || GB
|-
| Total || 4½ || 3½ || US
|}

1897 match 

The 1897 match was held 12–13 February 1897.  The British team had white on the odd-numbered boards and the United States team had white on the even-numbered boards.  The British team won by a single game, tying the series at one match each.

{| class="wikitable"
|-
! Board !! United States !! Great Britain !! Winner
|-
| 1 || Pillsbury || Blackburne || draw
|-
| 2 || Showalter || Locock || US
|-
| 3 || Burille || Atkins || GB
|-
| 4 || Barry || Lawrence || US
|-
| 5 || Hymes || Mills || draw
|-
| 6 || Hodges || Bellingham || draw
|-
| 7 || Delmar || Blake || US
|-
| 8 || Helms || Jackson || GB
|-
| 9 || Teed || Cole || GB
|-
| 10 || McCutcheon || Jacobs || GB
|-
| Total || 4½ || 5½ || GB
|}

1898 match 

The third match was held 18–19 March 1898.  The United States team had white on the odd-numbered boards and the British team had white on the even-numbered boards.  The British team won the match by a single game, taking the lead in the series two matches to one, and positioning themselves to end the series and take permanent possession of the Newnes cup should they win the 1899 match for three consecutive match wins. The British players were at the Grand Hall of the Hotel Cecil in London, along with Leopold Hoffer serving as the umpire for the American team.  The American players were at the Academy of Music in Brooklyn, with Isaac Rice serving as umpire for the British team.  World Champion Emanuel Lasker was the adjudicator, and for the third time Baron Albert von Rothschild was the referee.  The moves were transmitted by the Commercial Cable Company.

{| class="wikitable" style="text-align: center;"
|-
! Board !! United States !! Great Britain !! Winner
|-
| 1 || align=left|Harry Pillsbury || align=left|Joseph Henry Blackburne || draw
|-
| 2 || align=left|Jackson Showalter || align=left|Amos Burn || US
|-
| 3 || align=left|J. F. Barry || align=left|Horatio Caro || US
|-
| 4 || align=left|Edward Hymes || align=left|Henry Ernest Atkins || draw
|-
| 5 || align=left|Albert Hodges || align=left|G. E. Bellingham || US
|-
| 6 || align=left|Eugene Delmar || align=left|D. Y. Mills || GB
|-
| 7 || align=left|David Graham Baird || align=left|C. D. Locock || draw
|-
| 8 || align=left|F. K. Young || align=left|E. M. Jackson || GB
|-
| 9 || align=left|A. K. Robinson || align=left|Herbert Jacobs || GB
|-
| 10 || align=left|J. A. Galbreath || align=left|Herbert William Trenchard || GB
|-
| Total || 4½ || 5½ || GB
|}

1899 match 

The 1899 match was held 11–12 March 1899.  The British team had white on odd-numbered boards and the United States team had white on even-numbered boards.  The United States team won by a margin of two games, tying the series at two matches each.

{| class="wikitable"
|-
! Board !! United States !! Great Britain !! Winner
|-
| 1 || Pillsbury || Blackburne || GB
|-
| 2 || Showalter || Atkins || US
|-
| 3 || Barry || Lawrence || US
|-
| 4 || Hodges || Jackson || US
|-
| 5 || Hymes || Mills || draw
|-
| 6 || Voigt || Jacobs || draw
|-
| 7 || Johnston || Locock || draw
|-
| 8 || Marshall || Wainwright || draw
|-
| 9 || Newman || Bellingham || draw
|-
| 10 || Baird || Trenchard || draw
|-
| Total || 6 || 4 || US
|}

1900 match 

The 1900 match was held 23–24 March 1900.  The United States team had white on the odd-numbered boards and the British team had white on the even-numbered boards.  The United States team won by a margin of two games and they now led the British team three matches to two.  The United States team was also in position to end the series and win permanent custody of the Newnes cup should they win the 1901 match.

{| class="wikitable"
|-
! Board !! United States !! Great Britain !! Winner
|-
| 1 || Pillsbury || Blackburne || draw
|-
| 2 || Showalter || Lee || draw
|-
| 3 || Barry || Atkins || US
|-
| 4 || Hodges || Bellingham || US
|-
| 5 || Hymes || Mills || draw
|-
| 6 || Voigt || Lawrence || US
|-
| 7 || Marshall || Jackson || GB
|-
| 8 || Bampton || Jacobs || GB
|-
| 9 || Newman || Ward || draw
|-
| 10 || Delmar || Trenchard || US
|-
| Total || 6 || 4 || US
|}

1901 match 

The 1901 match was held 19–20 April 1901.  The British team had white on the odd-numbered boards and the United States team had white on the even-numbered boards.  The match was tied at five games each.  As the United States team did not win three consecutive matches, the series was not ended.

{| class="wikitable"
|-
! Board !! United States !! Great Britain !! Winner
|-
| 1 || Pillsbury || Blackburne || US
|-
| 2 || Showalter || Mason || GB
|-
| 3 || Barry || Lee || draw
|-
| 4 || Hodges || Mills || draw
|-
| 5 || Hymes || Atkins || US
|-
| 6 || Voigt || Bellingham || draw
|-
| 7 || Marshall || Ward || GB
|-
| 8 || Bampton || Jackson || draw
|-
| 9 || Newman || Jacobs || US
|-
| 10 || Howell || Michell || GB
|-
| Total || 5 || 5 || draw
|}

1902 match 

The 1902 match was held 14–15 March 1902.  Harry Pillsbury and Frank Marshall were in Europe to play at Monte Carlo, so they traveled to London to play their games in person.  The United States team had white on the odd-numbered boards and the British team had white on the even-numbered boards.  The United States team won by a single game.

{| class="wikitable"
|-
! Board !! United States !! Great Britain !! Winner
|-
| 1 || Pillsbury || Lawrence || draw
|-
| 2 || Barry || Mason || draw
|-
| 3 || Marshall || Atkins || GB
|-
| 4 || Hodges || Lee || US
|-
| 5 || Hymes || Mills || draw
|-
| 6 || Voigt || Bellingham || draw
|-
| 7 || Delmar || Trenchard || GB
|-
| 8 || Newman || Blake || draw
|-
| 9 || Howell || Michell || US
|-
| 10 || Helms || Girdlestone || US
|-
| Total || 5½ || 4½ || US
|}

1903 match 

The 1903 match was held 3–4 April 1903.  The British team had white on the odd-numbered boards and the United States team had white on the even-numbered boards.  Harry Pillsbury and Frank Marshall were in Europe to play at Monte Carlo, so they traveled to London to play their games in person.  The United States team won by a margin of one game.  With two consecutive match wins, the United States team could take permanent possession of the Newnes cup and end the series by winning the next match.

{| class="wikitable"
|-
! Board !! United States !! Great Britain !! Winner
|-
| 1 || Pillsbury || Lawrence || draw
|-
| 2 || Barry || Blackburne || US
|-
| 3 || Hodges || Mills || draw
|-
| 4 || Marshall || Atkins || US
|-
| 5 || Hymes || Bellingham || GB
|-
| 6 || Voigt || Trenchard || US
|-
| 7 || Newman || Michell || GB
|-
| 8 || Delmar || Jacobs || draw
|-
| 9 || Howell || Gunston || GB
|-
| 10 || Helms || Hooke || US
|-
| Total || 5½ || 4½ || US
|}

1904-1906 

No matches were held during these years due to other demand for cable traffic and technical difficulties.  In 1904 the Russo-Japanese war broke out a few weeks before the planned date of the cable match, and demand for war news made the cable match impractical.  In 1905, two of the transatlantic cables broke, one the night before the match was to begin.  Cable companies, initially less concerned about partially absorbing the costs of transmission during the slow period at the end of a week, became more reluctant to participate with increased demand for cable traffic.  The series was not reestablished until 1907.

1907 match 

The 1907 match was held 22–23 February 1907.  The United States team had white on the odd-numbered boards and the British team had white on the even-numbered boards.  Howell was in London, so played his game in person.  The British team won by a single game.

{| class="wikitable"
|-
! Board !! United States !! Great Britain !! Winner
|-
| 1 || Marshall || Burn || draw
|-
| 2 || Barry || Atkins || GB
|-
| 3 || Hodges || Lawrence || draw
|-
| 4 || Voigt || Blackburne || draw
|-
| 5 || Morgan || Richmond || GB
|-
| 6 || Fox || Lee || draw
|-
| 7 || Bampton || Ward || US
|-
| 8 || Wolbrecht || Holmes || draw
|-
| 9 || Howell || Michell || US
|-
| 10 || Robinson || Wainwright || GB
|-
| Total || 4½ || 5½ || GB
|}

1908 match 

The 1908 match was held 13–14 March 1908.  The British team had white on the odd-numbered boards and the United States team had white on the even-numbered boards.  The United States team won by a margin of three games.  The teams could not agree on a result for two uncompleted games (Blackburne–Hodges and Delmar–Richmond), so for the first time in the series adjudication was required.

{| class="wikitable"
|-
! Board !! United States !! Great Britain !! Winner
|-
| 1 || Hodges || Blackburne || draw
|-
| 2 || Voigt || Atkins || draw
|-
| 3 || Helms || Lawrence || draw
|-
| 4 || Delmar || Richmond || draw
|-
| 5 || Stadelman || Wainwright || draw
|-
| 6 || Howell || Ward || draw
|-
| 7 || Schwietzer || England || US
|-
| 8 || Wolbrect || Michell || US
|-
| 9 || Libaire || Palmer || US
|-
| 10 || Robinson || Sergeant || draw
|-
| Total || 6½ || 3½ || US
|}

1909 match 

The 1909 match was held 26–27 March 1909.  The United States team had white on the odd-numbered boards, and the British team had white on the even-numbered boards.  One unfinished game required adjudication (Mlotkowski-Sergeant).  The British team won by a margin of two games.

{| class="wikitable"
|-
! Board !! United States !! Great Britain !! Winner
|-
| 1 || Marshall || Blackburne || US
|-
| 2 || Barry || Lawrence || draw
|-
| 3 || Hodges || Ward || US
|-
| 4 || Voigt || Wainwright || US
|-
| 5 || Howell || Blake || GB
|-
| 6 || Helms || Michell || GB
|-
| 7 || Schwietzer || Wahltuch || GB
|-
| 8 || Stadelman || Holmes || draw
|-
| 9 || Mlotkowski || Sergeant || GB
|-
| 10 || Ruth || Jacobs || GB
|-
| Total || 4 || 6 || GB
|}

1910 match 

The 1910 match was held 11–12 March 1910.  The United States team had white on the odd-numbered boards and the British team had white on the even-numbered boards.  There were three unfinished games that required adjudication (Marshall–Blackburne, Wahltuch–Voigt, and Rosenfeld–Thomas).  The British team won by a margin of three games.  With two consecutive match victories, the British team could end the series and take permanent possession of the Newnes cup with a win in the 1911 match.  Sir George Newnes died several months after the 1910 match, so he would not see the completion of the series in 1911.

{| class="wikitable"
|-
! Board !! United States !! Great Britain !! Winner
|-
| 1 || Marshall || Blackburne || US
|-
| 2 || Barry || Atkins || GB
|-
| 3 || Hodges || Lawrence || draw
|-
| 4 || Voigt || Wahltuch || GB
|-
| 5 || Wolbrecht || Yates || GB
|-
| 6 || Stadelman || Wainwright || GB
|-
| 7 || Schweitzer || Ward || draw
|-
| 8 || Black || Blake || US
|-
| 9 || Rosenfeld || Thomas || GB
|-
| 10 || Meyer || Michell || draw
|-
| Total || 3½ || 6½ || GB
|}

1911 match 

The 1911 match was held 21–22 April 1911.  The British team had white on the odd-numbered boards and the United States team had white on the even-numbered boards.  Frank Marshall was in Europe to play at San Sebastian, so he traveled to London to play in person.  The British team won by a margin of two games, tying both the match record (+6 -6 =1) and the individual game record (+39 +39 =50).  However, by winning three consecutive matches, the British team took permanent possession of the Newnes cup and ended the series.  Fox was awarded a special gold medal for the best win by a United States player.

{| class="wikitable"
|-
! Board !! United States !! Great Britain !! Winner
|-
| 1 || Marshall || Burn || GB
|-
| 2 || Hodges || Atkins || draw
|-
| 3 || Fox || Lawrence || US
|-
| 4 || Barry || Wahltuch || GB
|-
| 5 || Voigt || Yates || GB
|-
| 6 || Black || Richmond || US
|-
| 7 || Walcott || Ward || GB
|-
| 8 || Milnes || Thomas || GB
|-
| 9 || Schwietzer || Michell || draw
|-
| 10 || Meyer || Cole || US
|-
| Total || 4 || 6 || GB
|}

Team members

British 

{| class="wikitable"
|-
! Matches !! Player !! Result !! Matches !! Player !! Result !! Matches !! Player !! Result
|-
| 12 || Henry Atkins || +4 −4 =4 || 4 || Amos Burn || +1 −2 =1 || 1 || Henry Bird || +0 −1 =0
|-
| 11 || Joseph Blackburne || +2 −4 =5 || 4 || Francis Lee || +0 −1 =3 || 1 || Horatio Caro || +0 −1 =0
|-
| 10 || Thomas Lawrence || +0 −4 =6 || 4 || Charles Locock || +0 −1 =3 || 1 || Harold Cole || +0 −1 =0
|-
| 8 || Reginald Michell || +3 −3 =2 || 4 || George Wainwright || +2 −1 =2 ||  1 || Henry Cole || +1 −0 =0
|-
| 8 || Daniel Mills || +1 −0 =7 || 3 || George Richmond || +1 −1 =1 || 1 || P R England || +0 −1 =0
|-
| 7 || George Edward H Bellingham || +1 −2 =4 || 3 || Victor Wahltuch || +3 −0 =0 || 1 || T B Girdlestone  || +0 −1 =0
|-
| 7 || Herbert Jacobs || +4 −1 =2 || 2 || Harry Holmes || +0 −0 =2 || 1 || William Gunston || +1 −0 =0
|-
| 7 || William Ward || +2 −2 =3 || 2 || James Mason || +1 −0 =1 || 1 || George Hooke || +0 −1 =0
|-
| 6 || Edward Jackson || +4 −1 =1 || 2 || Edward Sergeant || +1 −0 =1 || 1 || W C Palmer || +0 −1 =0
|-
| 5 || Herbert Trenchard || +2 −2 =1 || 2 || George Thomas || +2 −0 =0 || 1 || Samuel Tinsley || +0 −1 =0
|-
| 4 || Joseph Blake || +1 −2 =1 || 2 || Frederick Yates || +2 −0 =0 ||  ||  || 
|}

United States 

{| class="wikitable"
|-
! Matches !! Player !! Result !! Matches !! Player !! Result !! Matches !! Player !! Result
|-
| 13 || Albert Hodges || +5 −0 =8 || 4 || George Schwietzer || +1 −1 =2 || 1 || Sidney Johnston || +0 −0 =1
|-
| 12 || John Barry || +6 −3 =3 || 3 || David Baird || +0 −1 =2 || 1 || Edward Libaire || +1 −0 =0
|-
| 9 || Hermann Voigt || +3 −2 =5 || 3 || Samuel Bampton || +1 −1 =1 || 1 || John McCutcheon || +0 −1 =0
|-
| 9 || Frank Marshall || +3 −4 =2 || 3 || Alfred Robinson || +0 −2 =1 || 1 || B F Milnes || +0 −1 =0
|-
| 8 || Edward Hymes || +1 −1 =6 || 3 || Samuel Stadelman || +0 −1 =2 || 1 || Stasch Mlotkowski || +0 −1 =0
|-
| 8 || Harry Pillsbury || +1 −2 =5 || 3 || George Wolbrecht || +1 −1 =1 || 1 || Mordecai Morgan || +0 −1 =0
|-
| 7 || Eugene Delmar || +2 −2 =3 || 2 || Roy Turnbull Black || +2 −0 =0 || 1 || Herbert Rosenfeld || +0 −1 =0
|-
| 6 || Clarence Howell || +2 −3 =1 || 2 || Constant Burille || +1 −1 =0 || 1 || William Ruth || +0 −1 =0
|-
| 6 || Jackson Showalter || +4 −1 =1 || 2 || Albert Fox || +1 −0 =1 || 1 || Frank Teed || +0 −1 =0
|-
| 5 || Hermann Helms || +2 −2 =1 || 2 || L B Meyer || +1 −0 =1 || 1 || George Walcott || +0 −1 =0
|-
| 5 || Charles Newman || +1 −1 =3 || 1 || John Galbreath || +0 −1 =0 || 1 || Franklin Young || +0 −1 =0
|}

Other Anglo-American cable matches 

Between 1899 and 1924, eleven Anglo-American university cable matches were held.  As with the national teams, it was an evenly-contested series, with four wins each and three drawn matches.  A special cable match between the House of Commons and the House of Representatives held in 1897 was also drawn.

See also
 USA vs. USSR radio chess match 1945

References

External links 
 Games of the Anglo-American cable matches in web-viewable form at chessgames.com
 History of the Atlantic Cable & Undersea Communications
 Brooklyn Daily Eagle online archive (1841–1902)
 NY times on the 1896-1897-1898 matches
 A Tale of Three Cities: the 1895/97 Pacific Cable Matches, originally published in En Passant, December 1999
 Library of Congress online newspaper archive
 On the Reichhelm Cable Notation for Chess

History of chess
Chess competitions
Chess in the United Kingdom
Chess in the United States
1896 in chess
1897 in chess
1898 in chess
1899 in chess
1900 in chess
1901 in chess
1902 in chess
1903 in chess
1907 in chess
1908 in chess
1909 in chess
1910 in chess
1911 in chess